Stellaville is an unincorporated community in Jefferson County, in the U.S. state of Georgia.

History
An early variant name was "Sisterville". A post office called Stellaville was established in 1872, and remained in operation until 1954.  The present name is after Stella Brinson, the daughter of a local citizen.

The Georgia General Assembly incorporated Stellaville as a town in 1891. The town's municipal charter was repealed in 1995.

References

Former municipalities in Georgia (U.S. state)
Unincorporated communities in Georgia (U.S. state)
Unincorporated communities in Jefferson County, Georgia
Populated places disestablished in 1995